Julien Fabri (born 5 February 1994) is a French professional footballer who plays as a goalkeeper for  club Bastia.

Career
Fabri signed for his boyhood club, Marseille, at the age of eleven as a youth player. On 8 July 2014, after nine years with the academy, he signed professional terms with Marseille. On 21 July 2015, it was announced that he signed a contract extension with Marseille and would go on loan to newly promoted Ligue 2 side, Bourg-Péronnas. He made his professional debut for the club on 11 August 2015 against Brest in the Coupe de la Ligue playing the full-match as Bourg-Péronnas won on penalties.

On 30 October 2019, Fabri signed a two-year contract with Châteauroux.

Fabri did not play in the 2021–22 season. On 23 May 2022, he signed a two-year contract with Bastia.

Career statistics

References

1994 births
Living people
French footballers
Footballers from Marseille
Association football goalkeepers
Olympique de Marseille players
Football Bourg-en-Bresse Péronnas 01 players
LB Châteauroux players
SC Bastia players
Ligue 1 players 
Ligue 2 players